(born 27 April 1975) is a Japanese former ski jumper. He ranked among the most successful sportsmen of its discipline, particularly in the 1990s. Funaki is known for his special variant of the V-style, in which the body lies flatter between the skis than usual.

Career
Funaki began ski jumping at the age of eleven. His birthplace Yoichi is also the home of Yukio Kasaya, who was a Japanese national hero with his Normal Hill victory in the 1972 Winter Olympics at Sapporo. Kasaya was also Funaki's role model.

Funaki had his first World Cup appearance on December 20, 1992 in Sapporo. His first World Cup victory was achieved on December 10, 1994 in the normal hill at Planica, Slovenia. Several weeks later, he was leading the Four Hills Tournament in total tour points after the third event.  In the second part of the last event at Bischofshofen, he had the longest jump of  131.5 meters, but fell during the landing - and the overall tour victory went to Austrian Andreas Goldberger, and Funaki finished second.

Altogether Funaki won 15 World Cup career victories, his last on February 5, 2005 at Sapporo.  He achieved his best results in the 1997/98 season with a second rank in the World Cup rankings.  In that season he also won the Four Hills Tournament.

In 1997, Funaki won the ski jumping event at the Holmenkollen ski festival. He also won the FIS Ski-Flying World Championships 1998 in Oberstdorf.

The high point of his career was in the 1998 Winter Olympic Games at Nagano.  In front of his local crowd, Funaki won the individual gold medal on the individual large Hill, which was the first Olympic ski jumping gold for Japan since 1972, the team large hill gold medal, and the individual normal hill silver medal behind the Finn Jani Soininen. During those games, he became only the second person to ever achieve perfect marks from all five judges (20 points is the highest attainable mark), following Toni Innauer who had achieved this masterpiece already in 1976 and preceding Sven Hannawald (2003), Hideharu Miyahira (2003) and Wolfgang Loitzl (2009). In honor of these achievements, he represented Asia in carrying the Olympic Flag during the opening ceremonies of the next Winter Olympics, in Salt Lake City.

At the FIS Nordic World Ski Championships, he became the world champion of the individual normal hill in 1999 at Ramsau, Austria.  And together with the Japanese team, he placed 2nd in the Team large hill in 1997, 1999 and 2003.

For his ski jumping successes, Funaki received the Holmenkollen medal in 1999.

While he does not compete in World Cup or Continental Cup events, Funaki still takes part in local Japanese competitions. In March 2019 he finished 10th and 42nd in FIS Race events in Sapporo.

World Cup

Standings

Wins

See also
 List of multiple Olympic gold medalists at a single Games

References

External links 
 
 

1975 births
Holmenkollen medalists
Holmenkollen Ski Festival winners
Japanese male ski jumpers
Living people
Olympic ski jumpers of Japan
Olympic gold medalists for Japan
Olympic silver medalists for Japan
Ski jumpers at the 1998 Winter Olympics
Ski jumpers at the 2002 Winter Olympics
Sportspeople from Hokkaido
People from Yoichi, Hokkaido
Olympic medalists in ski jumping
FIS Nordic World Ski Championships medalists in ski jumping
Medalists at the 1998 Winter Olympics
Asian Games medalists in ski jumping
Ski jumpers at the 2003 Asian Winter Games
Ski jumpers at the 2011 Asian Winter Games
Asian Games gold medalists for Japan
Asian Games silver medalists for Japan
Medalists at the 2003 Asian Winter Games
Medalists at the 2011 Asian Winter Games